Lattasburg is an unincorporated community in Wayne County, Ohio, United States.

History
Lattasburg was originally called West Union, and under the latter name was platted in 1851. The present name honors Ephraim Latta, an early settler. A post office called Lattasburgh was established in 1867, the spelling was changed to Lattasburg in 1893, and the post office closed in 1905.

References

Unincorporated communities in Wayne County, Ohio
Unincorporated communities in Ohio